Agnes Rehni (24 May 1887 – 3 November 1966) was a Danish stage and film actress.

Selected filmography

Telegramtyvene - 1915
Grevindens ære - 1919
Københavnere - 1933
Flight from the Millions - 1934
Giftes-nej tak - 1936
Inkognito - 1937
Champagnegaloppen - 1938
Komtessen på Stenholt - 1939
Sørensen og Rasmussen - 1940
Sommerglæder - 1940
Søren Søndervold - 1942
Forellen - 1942
Jeg mødte en morder - 1943
Det gælder os alle - 1949
Mosekongen - 1950
Fodboldpræsten - 1951
Det store løb - 1952
Kærlighedsdoktoren - 1952
Far til fire - 1953
Min søn Peter - 1953
 We Who Go the Kitchen Route - 1953
Far til fire i sneen - 1954
Far til fire i byen - 1956
Far til fire og onkel Sofus - 1957
Far til fire og ulveungerne - 1958
Pige i søgelyset - 1959
Far til fire på Bornholm - 1959
Helle for Helene - 1959
Far til fire med fuld musik - 1961
Støvsugerbanden - 1963
Sommer i Tyrol - 1964
Kampen om Næsbygaard - 1964
En ven i bolignøden - 1965
Næsbygaards arving - 1965

External links

Biography at the Danish Film Institute (Danish)

Danish film actresses
Danish silent film actresses
20th-century Danish actresses
Danish stage actresses
1887 births
1966 deaths
Place of death missing